Taiwan Sign Language (TSL) is the sign language most commonly used by the deaf and hard of hearing in Taiwan.

History
The beginnings of Taiwan Sign Language date from 1895.

The origins of TSL developed from Japanese Sign Language during Japanese rule. TSL is considered part of the Japanese Sign Language family.

TSL has some mutual intelligibility with both Japanese Sign Language and Korean Sign Language; it has about a 60% lexical similarity with JSL. 
 
There are two main dialects of TSL centered on two of the three major sign language schools in Taiwan: one in Taipei, the other in Tainan City. There is a variant based in Taichung, but this sign language is essentially the same as the Tainan school.

After the retrocession of Taiwan to the ROC, Taiwan absorbed an influx of Chinese Sign Language users from mainland China who influenced TSL through teaching methods and loanwords.

Serious linguistic research into TSL began in the 1970s and is continuing at present. The first International Symposium on Taiwan Sign Language Linguistics was held on March 1–2, 2003, at National Chung Cheng University in Minxiong, Chiayi, Taiwan.

Functional markers 
TSL, like other sign languages, incorporates nonmanual markers with lexical, syntactic, discourse, and affective functions. These include brow raising and furrowing, frowning, head shaking and nodding, and leaning and shifting the torso.

In popular culture 
The 2020 psychological-thriller The Silent Forest uses a large amount of the Taipei variant of TSL in the dialogue.

Notes

References

 Brentari, Diane. (2010). Sign Languages. Cambridge: Cambridge University Press. ;  OCLC 428024472

Further reading 
 Sasaki, Daisuke. (2007). "Comparing the lexicons of Japanese Sign Language and Taiwan Sign Language: a preliminary study focusing on the difference in the handshape parameter," Sign Language in Contact: Sociolinguistics in Deaf Communities (David Quinto-Pozos, editor). Washington, D.C.: Gallaudet University Press. ;  OCLC 154789790
Smith, Wayne H. Taiwan Sign Language research: an historical overview. Language and Linguistics (Taipei)  6.2 (2005): 187–215. Online free access
 Moratto, Riccardo. (2020). Taiwan Sign Language Interpreting: Theoretical Aspects and Pragmatic Issues. New York: Peter Lang.

External links
 TSL Online Dictionary (in English and Traditional Chinese)
 Sign Language Dictionary from Ministry of Education Republic of China (Taiwan)(in traditional Chinese)

Japanese Sign Language family
Languages of Taiwan
Disability in Taiwan